Chinese Tatars form one of the 56 ethnic groups officially recognized by the People's Republic of China.

The number of Chinese Tatars stood at 3,556 as of the year 2010 and they live mainly in the cities of Yining, Tacheng and Ürümqi in Xinjiang. Their titular homeland is the Daquan Tatar Ethnic Township in Qitai County of Changji Hui Autonomous Prefecture, which sits on the edge of the Gurbantünggüt Desert.

Culture 
Tatars traditionally acted as mediators in the relations between Russians and the native Muslim peoples of Xinjiang. The first wave of permanent Tatar settlement in Xinjiang began in 1851, primarily in cities such as Ghulja. Tatars brought progressive ideas and new institutions into Xinjiang, where they cemented themselves in the cultural and political fabric of the region. Jadid schools (including institutions for girls), mosques, and libraries catering to the Tatar community were opened in the second half of the 19th-century and in the first decades of the 20th-century. During this period, many intellectuals were brought from Tatarstan to staff the schools and colleges.

Chinese Tatars speak an archaic variant of the Tatar language, free from 20th-century loanwords and use the Arabic variant of the Tatar alphabet, which declined in the USSR in the 1930s. Being surrounded by speakers of other Turkic languages, Chinese Tatar partially reverses the Tatar high vowel inversion.

Chinese Tatars are Sunni Muslims. Most Tatars can speak Uyghur and often utilize the Uyghur Arabic script for writing.

Notable people
 Burhan Shahidi (1894–1989), political leader, Vice Chairman of the Chinese People's Political Consultative Conference
 Xabib Yunich (1905–1945), journalist and politician
 Margub Ishakov (1923–1992), military officer, Shàojiàng in the People's Liberation Army
 Aisihaiti (disappeared 1968), politician, delegate to the National People's Congress
 Soyüngül Chanisheff, Chinese-Australian author and political activist of the East Turkestan People's Revolutionary Party

See also
 Tatars
 Volga Tatars

References

Citations

Sources

 Paul and Bernice Noll's Window on the World - List of ethnic groups in China and their population sizes

 
Chinese
Xinjiang
Ethnic groups officially recognized by China
Muslim communities of China
Volga Tatars
Volga Tatar diaspora